Most election predictors for the 2020 United States presidential election used:
 Tossup: No advantage
 Tilt: Advantage that is not quite as strong as "lean"
 Lean: Slight advantage
 Likely: Significant, but surmountable, advantage (highest rating given by CBS News and NPR)
 Safe or solid: Near-certain chance of victory

Notes

References

Further reading

 2021 special issue of PS: Political Science & Politics on "Forecasting the 2020 US Elections."

External links
 General Elections, 3 November 2020, Reports and findings from the OSCE/ODIHR election observation mission

2020 United States presidential election
Donald Trump 2020 presidential campaign
Joe Biden 2020 presidential campaign
Impact of the COVID-19 pandemic on politics
November 2020 events in the United States
Prediction